The Nichirei International Championships is a defunct WTA Tour affiliated professional women's tennis tournament played from 1990 to 1996. It was held in Tokyo in Japan and was played on indoor carpet courts in 1990 and on outdoor hard courts from 1991 to 1996.

Monica Seles won the event a record three times, representing the Socialist Federal Republic of Yugoslavia in 1991, the Federal Republic of Yugoslavia in 1992, and the United States in 1996. Mary Joe Fernández garnered the most championships overall, with four of her five triumphs coming in the doubles competition.

The tournament was replaced by the Toyota Princess Cup.

Prize money

Finals

Singles

Doubles

References
 WTA Results Archive

 
Hard court tennis tournaments
Carpet court tennis tournaments
Indoor tennis tournaments
Defunct tennis tournaments in Japan
WTA Tour
Recurring sporting events established in 1990
Recurring events disestablished in 1996